Cape James Hill is a headland in the Wandel Sea, Arctic Ocean, northeast Greenland.

The cape was named by Robert Peary after James J. Hill, one of the members of the Peary Arctic Club in New York.

Geography
Cape James Hill is located east of Cape Morris Jesup, Peary Land, between Constable Bay to the west and Bliss Bay to the east. Administratively it is part of the Northeast Greenland National Park.

References

External links
 Thin-section 4543, glaciolacustrine sediments from Kap James Hill, Peary Land, Greenland
Late Quaternary glaciation history of northernmost Greenland

Headlands of Greenland
Peary Land